The last stage of the Falklands War was the surrender of the Argentine Governor at Port Stanley.

Surrender

At 2100 hours on 14 June 1982, the commander of the Argentine garrison in Stanley, General Mario Menéndez, surrendered to Major General Jeremy Moore. The surrender was contrary to the Argentine Army code stating that a surrender should not happen unless more than 50% of the men were casualties and 75% of the ammunition was spent.

The terms of the surrender document were slightly changed after negotiation by General Menéndez. 
The phrase unconditional surrender was changed for the term surrender. The Argentines were granted:
 The Argentines units will retain their flags.
 The units will remain under control of their respective officers
 The surrender ceremony will be private (not public)
 The Argentine officers will retain their sidearms.

 The final point about the returning of the 11,313 prisoners of war in their own ships was not accepted and 4,167 of them were repatriated to Argentina on the ocean liner Canberra alone. The junta had incorrectly stated that the liner had been crippled during the Battle of San Carlos.

Surrender document
Present at the signing of the letter of surrender were: 
 Captain Melbourne Hussey, Argentine Navy Translator
 General de Brigada Mario Menéndez Argentine Army
 Vicecomodoro Carlos Bloomer-Reeve, Argentine Air Force
 Vicecommodore Eugenio J Miari, Argentine Air Force,  Senior Argentine legal advisor
 Captain Rod Bell, Royal Marines  Translator
 Lieutenant-Colonel Geoff Field, Royal Engineers
 Colonel Brian Pennicott, Royal Artillery
 Major General Jeremy Moore, Royal Marines
 Colonel Mike Rose, Special Air Service
 Colonel Tom Seccombe, Royal Marines
 Staff Sergeant Glenn Harwood Royal Signals

The letter of surrender read:

Captured Argentine equipment

Quantities are approximates:

 100 Mercedes-Benz MB 1112/13/14 trucks
 20 Unimogs
 50 Mercedes-Benz G-Class 4x4s
 12 Panhard AML 90mm vehicles
 1 SAM Roland launcher
 7 SAM Tigercats launchers
 1 Improvised Exocet launcher
 3 CITER 155mm L33 Guns
 >10 Oto Melara 105mm cannons
 >15 Oerlikon twins 35 mm and 15 Rheinmetall twin 20 mm air defence cannons and 20 Hispano Suiza 30 mm single barrel guns.
 1 AN/TPS-43 3D mobile air search radar
 1 AN/TPS-44 mobile air search radar
 >5 Skyguard FC radars plus (1 damaged in missile strike), 1 Super Fledermaus FC radar and several RASIT fire control radars
 Blowpipe Manpads
 SAM-7 Manpads (bought in late May from Gaddafi's Libya)
 14 flyable helicopters (2 Agusta A109, 2 Bell 212, 8 UH-1H, 1 Chinook and 1 Puma)
 >10 FMA IA 58 Pucará
 1 Aermacchi MB-339
 Argentine Coast Guard patrol boat GC82 Islas Malvinas - renamed HMS Tiger Bay
 >11,000 personal weapons
 >4 million 7.62 munition rounds (10,500 from Goose Green) 
 >11,000 105mm ammunition rounds

Some of the equipment was rendered useless by Argentine personnel before the surrender.

The Argentine Rattenbach commission was assembled after the war to investigate the causes of defeat. It recommended serious penalties for some of the officers in charge, but its influence on the later trial was practically nil.

Aftermath

On 20 June, the British retook the South Sandwich Islands and declared hostilities to be over after removing Argentina's Southern Thule garrison at the Corbeta Uruguay base. Corbeta Uruguay was established in 1976, but the Argentine base was only contested through diplomatic channels by the UK until 1982.

The war lasted 74 days, with 255 British and 649 Argentine soldiers, marines, sailors, and airmen, and three civilian Falklanders killed.

The British Government decreed that all classified information would be available to the public in the year 2082.  However, following the Freedom of Information Act, a great deal of formerly classified material is now available.

The surrender document is on display at the Imperial War Museum in London.  As noted in the museum, the time of surrender was backdated three hours in order that both Zulu time (UTC) and the local time were recorded as 14 June even though technically it was already 15 June in London, in order to prevent possible confusion by Argentine troops who might have mistakenly thought that they were permitted to keep fighting until the next day, 15 June 1982.

Relations between the UK and Argentina were not restored until 1989 and only under the umbrella formula which states that the islands sovereignty dispute will remain aside.

14 June has been a public holiday in the Falkland Islands since 1984, officially called as "Liberation Day".

References

Bibliography 
 Guerra Bajo la Cruz del Sur, Eduardo Jose Costa 

Falklands War
British Army in the Falklands War
Surrenders
June 1982 events in South America